Last Thing on My Mind or The Last Thing on My Mind may refer to:
 "The Last Thing on My Mind", 1964 song written and first recorded by Tom Paxton, which has been covered by a number of artists
 "Last Thing on My Mind" (Bananarama song), 1992 single by Bananarama made famous by Steps
 "The Last Thing on My Mind" (Patty Loveless song), 2000 single by Patty Loveless
 "Last Thing on My Mind" (Ronan Keating song), 2004 single by Ronan Keating and LeAnn Rimes